Scutoverticidae is a family of oribatids in the order Oribatida. There are about 8 genera and at least 50 described species in Scutoverticidae.

Genera
 Arthrovertex Balogh, 1970
 Ethiovertex Mahunka, 1982
 Exochocepheus Woolley & Higgins, 1968
 Hypovertex Krivolutsky, 1969
 Lamellovertex Bernini, 1976
 Provertex Mihelcic, 1959
 Scutovertex Michael, 1879
 Scutoverticosus Kok, 1968

References

Further reading

 
 
 
 

Acariformes
Acari families